Gia Lam Train Company is a Vietnamese railcar manufacturer. The company supplies cars to Vietnam Railways. Gia Lam is also the name of the main station in Hanoi, and also an airport.

Products
 Air suspension bogie for coach
 Bogie for coach
 Air-conditioned double-deck car
 Air-conditioned buffet car
 Would be used coaches

See also 
 Transport in Vietnam
 Gia Lâm (disambiguation)

References

 

Rail vehicle manufacturers of Vietnam